Cymus robustus is a species of true bug in the family Cymidae. It is found in North America.

References

Lygaeoidea
Articles created by Qbugbot
Insects described in 1924